Anthony Kaun Hai? is a 2006 Indian Hindi-language mystery thriller film directed by Raj Kaushal and produced by Nikhil Panchamiya. It stars Sanjay Dutt, Arshad Warsi, Minissha Lamba and Raghuvir Yadav.

Plot

The film is set in Bangkok, Thailand. It starts with Master Madan (Sanjay Dutt), an underworld killer performing a mission to claim debt from someone, and taking Anthony Gonsalves (Arshad Warsi) as hostage. Master threatens the debtor to kill Anthony if he doesn't repay the debt in two hours. However, the man claims he is not the Anthony Gonsalves he's looking for, and tells him a story to clarify.

Gonsalves says his real name is Champak Chaudhary, alias Champ. He made a living by forging passports, ID cards and all other legal documents. He was in love with Roza (Anusha Dhandekar), who agrees to marry him. During their wedding, Champ is arrested and later sentenced to six months in jail.

In jail, Champ meet Raghu (Raghuvir Yadav), who is serving his life sentence for stealing diamonds from Thai Queen. Raghu is a magician and used his magic tricks to steal the Queen's diamonds; he did it for his daughter Jia (Minissha Lamba), and he buried the stolen diamonds before he was arrested. Raghu appears to be deaf and dumb in the jail. Champ is the first one to find Raghu is neither deaf nor dumb as he talks with Champ. The reason Raghu speaks to Champ is that he wants Champ's help to get out of the jail, as the former learns his wife is dead, and his daughter Jia is now alone. He offers half of his diamonds, which he claims worths of 100 million THB, in exchange of Champ's help to get him out of the jail.

Champ refuses Raghu's offer at first because he doesn't want to make trouble for himself as he will finish his service in jail very soon. However, after Champ is released, he finds Roza is married to another guy and pregnant with that man's baby. Upset Champ agrees now with Raghu's offer, and gets him out of jail with a forged Release Notice.

The real Anthony Gonsalves is, however, a journalist who is eager to find some big scandal. He once spots the scene that a powerful man Luck Sharma murdering a girl and shoots it with his camera. He sends the CD of the video that Lucky murdering the girl to Lucky to blackmail him for 10 million THB. Lucky Sharma killed him in return.

Released, Champ and Raghu gets their new identities from Champ's friend Dr. Lashwani (Ravi Baswani). However, the new identity Champ gets is Anthony Gonsalves, because Lashwani was just conducting autopsy for real Gonsalves's dead body when Champ asked his help to get a new identity, and he came up with the name. Champ and Raghu meet Jia later.

After Champ is using Gonsalves's identity, Lucky's man is also shocked to know that Gonsalves is still alive, so they plan to kill him again, but Champ, who they think is Gonsalves, escapes, and Raghu dies in the shooting.

Learning her father owes 50 million THB to Champ for getting him out of jail, Jia shows Champ the place where her father buried the diamonds, which is now inside a jailyard. Champ falls in love with Jia, and he soon learns who is real Anthony Gonsalves and the story of him, so he reports to the police and asks to be locked in the jail as witness protection. In the jail, Champ digs out the diamonds and sends them one by one to Jia through a pigeon.

Champ later gives the CD to inspector Suraj Singh (Gulshan Grover) and Lucky Sharma is therefore arrested.

After listening to Champ's full story, Master Madan supports him. He shoots Lucky Sharma's men who come to kill Champ. Also, he lends his ferrari to Champ for catching the flight that Jia is supposed to fly with. Champ sees Jia at the airport before she boards the flight, and they confess their love to each other and re-unite.

Cast

Sanjay Dutt as Master Madan
Arshad Warsi as Champak "Champ" Choudhary / Anthony Gonsalves
Minissha Lamba as Jia Sharma 
Raghuvir Yadav as Raghuveer Sharma, Jia’s father
Anusha Dhandekar as Rosa
Gulshan Grover as Inspector Suraj Singh
Ravi Baswani as Dr. Lashwani
Anupam Shyam as Pappu
Rajesh Tiwari as Pappu's Henchman
Himesh Reshammiya as himself - Special Appearance

Soundtrack

Production
Anthony Kaun Hai was shot in the whole of Bangkok and Krabi, Thailand.

Actor Sanjay Dutt drove a Ferrari 360 in the film.

References

Zee News review

External links
 

2000s Hindi-language films
Films scored by Himesh Reshammiya
2006 films
2000s mystery thriller films
Indian mystery thriller films